James Tipper (June 18, 1849 – April 21, 1895) was an American professional baseball player who played as an outfielder during his three-year career in the National Association.  He played for three teams during his career, all based in the state of Connecticut: his hometown Middletown Mansfields in 1872, the Hartford Dark Blues in 1874, and the New Haven Elm Citys in 1875.  He later played in several minor league seasons; a Live Oaks team in Lynn, Massachusetts, a season for the Syracuse Stars in 1876, two seasons for the Rochester, New York team of the International Association, and one for the Manchester, New Hampshire team of the National Association.  Tipper died in New Haven, Connecticut at the age of 45 of consumption (tuberculosis).

References

External links

Major League Baseball outfielders
Middletown Mansfields players
Hartford Dark Blues players
New Haven Elm Citys players
Baseball players from Connecticut
19th-century baseball players
1849 births
1895 deaths
Rochester (minor league baseball) players
Manchester (minor league baseball) players
Sportspeople from Middletown, Connecticut
19th-century deaths from tuberculosis
Tuberculosis deaths in Connecticut